The Tribune Tower is a 305-ft. (93 m), 22-story building located in downtown Oakland, California. Built in 1906, tower erected in 1923, the 89,251 sq.-ft. (8,291 sq.-m.) building was the tallest building in Oakland constructed in the 1920s. It is currently the 11th tallest building in Oakland.

The architecture of the tower, much like The Campanile on the UC Berkeley campus (officially the Sather Tower), was inspired by St Mark's Campanile in Venice, Italy.

The building was opened by Joseph R. Knowland on January 1, 1924, as the home of the Oakland Tribune newspaper, and is a symbol of both the Tribune and the city of Oakland.

History
In 1915, when Joseph Knowland, a former U.S. congressman, acquired the Oakland Tribune, the newspaper was located at Eighth and Franklin streets in the old Golden West Hotel. In 1918, the Breuner Furniture Company vacated its home at Thirteenth and Franklin. Knowland envisioned the vacated showroom and an adjacent warehouse as the site of a first-class newspaper facility. He began to implement this vision with the acquisition of the Breuner's property and the move of the Tribune there.

What became the six-story base of the Tribune Tower had been designed by D. Franklin Oliver and completed in 1906. (The warehouse, which became the Tribune'''s press room, had been built in the 1890s on the site of the old Pantages Theatre.) The now-familiar clock tower, designed by Edward T. Foulkes, was added in 1923 to complete the Tribune Tower as it appears today. The architect designed the tower with a mix of French and Italian classical elements, topped with a copper green mansard roof with punched eye windows.

From 1924, the Tower would appear on the newspaper's masthead. The top floor of the tower housed radio station KLX from its opening until the station was sold in 1959. KLX was sold to pay off debts incurred in the ill-fated 1958 run by U.S. Senator William F. Knowland, Joseph Knowland's son, for governor of California. Joseph Knowland was a political mentor to his son, as well as to California attorney general and governor Earl Warren and many other Republicans.

The Tribune Tower gained national attention in 1923 when magician Harry Houdini demonstrated his skills by escaping from a straitjacket while dangling upside down from the ninth floor of the building.  (It took him five seconds to escape.)

The building was declared a city landmark on May 4, 1976. At various times, the building has flown a flag with the word, "THERE" emblazoned upon it. This is a send-up of Gertrude Stein's comment that in Oakland "there is no there there."

In 1979, Gannett Company purchased the newspaper and the Tower from the Tribune Publishing Corporation. The company later sold the Tribune to its editor and publisher, Robert C. Maynard and his wife, Nancy Hicks Maynard, in 1983—making them the first African-Americans to own a major metropolitan daily newspaper in the United States.

The Tower was damaged in the 1989 Loma Prieta earthquake, which forced the Tribune to relocate to new offices in Jack London Square. The Tower sat empty until 1995, when John Protopappas purchased it for $300,000. His company, Madison Park Financial Corporation, renovated the Tower in the late 1990s. The Tribune's parent company, ANG Newspapers (which purchased the newspaper from the Maynards in 1992), returned the Tribune to the building after it reopened in 1999. In early 2006, Protopappas sold the Tower to Edward B. Kislinger for approximately $15 million. The Tribune'' moved permanently out of the Tower in 2007 and is now located in a building on Oakport Street, near the Oakland International Airport.

The Clock mechanisms were rebuilt in 1999 by Kevin Binkert.  The clock faces were restored and repainted in the late fall of 2006. On December 22 of that year the faces and the famous TRIBUNE lettering were relit. The top of the Tribune Tower once again acts as a beacon for those approaching downtown Oakland.

The building was originally meant for Zeppelin landing, the airship was to be tied off to the mast (flagpole) and the drop ladder to come down onto the 20th floor walkway. The 21st and 22nd floors also contain a water tank which held reserve water for a gravity feed to the fire suppression system in case the city water main was breached. The roof of the building is coated in bronze, giving it the green color due to oxidation. The roof features an 86-foot flagpole and a civil defense siren.

Although the Oakland Tribune newspaper group moved out of the Tower in 2007, the building houses offices, the Tribune Tavern restaurant and Modern Coffee cafe on the ground level. The facade that overhangs the Tower's main entrance, however, still bears the newspaper's iconic logo. The largest tenant, CallSocket, was a fast-growing call center business now closed, and a project owned by the San Francisco Regional Center.

The building was purchased for $8 million by Tom Henderson, SFRC's CEO and an Oakland native, in December 2011 and seized by an Alameda County Superior Court judge in April 2016 along with several other company assets.  In 2017 Tom Henderson was sued by the US Government (SEC) and accused of running a fraudulent scheme with Chinese investors' money. Richard Ellis (CBRE) was the commercial realty brokerage that handled the deal. CallSocket occupied about 37,000 square feet on multiple floors of the 83,000-square-foot landmark at 13th and Franklin streets.

Harvest Properties, Inc., a full-service commercial real estate investment firm headquartered in Oakland, purchased the building out of receivership for approximately $20 million.  Harvest began major renovations to the building in 2017.

See also
List of tallest buildings in Oakland
Yule Marble

External links

 Oaklandwiki.org: Tribune Tower

References

Skyscraper office buildings in Oakland, California
Oakland Tribune
Clock towers in California
Newspaper headquarters in the United States
Towers in California
History of Oakland, California
Historic district contributing properties in California
Romanesque Revival architecture in California
National Register of Historic Places in Alameda County, California
Commercial buildings on the National Register of Historic Places in California
Office buildings completed in 1924